The New York City Council Jewish Caucus comprises the Jewish members  of the New York City Council. The caucus is dedicated to advocating for social services, fighting Jewish poverty in New York City, supporting Israel, and advancing inter-faith relations.

History
In 1991 Councilmember Herbert Berman (D-Brooklyn) formed the “Jewish Study Group” to advocate for Jewish institutional concerns to the administration of Mayor David Dinkins.  In 2001 the group changed its name to the “Jewish Caucus”, and was chaired by Councilmember Michael Chaim Nelson (D-Brooklyn) from 2001-2013.  Councilmember Mark D. Levine (D-Manhattan) served as chair of the caucus from 2014-2017.

Current members
 Eric Dinowitz (D-Bronx) - Chair
 Ari Kagan (D-Brooklyn)
 Julie Menin (D-Manhattan)
 Lincoln Restler (D-Brooklyn)
 Lynn Schulman (D-Queens)
 Inna Vernikov (R-Brooklyn)

Former members
 Andy Cohen (D-Bronx)
 Barry Grodenchik (D-Queens)
 Ben Kallos (D-Manhattan)
 Karen Koslowitz (D-Queens)
 Rory Lancman (D-Queens)
 Brad Lander (D-Brooklyn) 
 Stephen Levin (D-Brooklyn)
 Mark D. Levine (D-Manhattan)
 Alan Maisel (D-Brooklyn)
 Helen Rosenthal (D-Manhattan)
 Mark Treyger (D-Brooklyn)

References

New York City Council
Judaism in New York City

External links